Bosse may refer to:

 Bosse (name)
 Bosse (musician), German singer and songwriter
 La Bosse (disambiguation)
 Benjamin Bosse High School, Evansville, IN, USA
 Bosse Field, stadium for minor league baseball team in Evansville, IN, USA

See also 
 Bossé (disambiguation)